King George is a suburb in Honiara, Solomon Islands located East of the main center and west of Henderson

References

Populated places in Guadalcanal Province
Suburbs of Honiara